Vísir was an Icelandic newspaper founded in December 1910 by Einar Gunnarsson, originally only distributed in and around Reykjavík. In 1967, Jónas Kristjánsson became its editor. In 1975, he left the paper after a conflict with the ownership group of on his editorial policy and founded Dagblaðið.

On 26 November 1981, Vísir and Dagblaðið merged to form Dagblaðið Vísir.

References

1910 establishments in Iceland
Publications established in 1910
Daily newspapers published in Iceland
Defunct newspapers published in Iceland
Mass media in Reykjavík
Publications disestablished in 1981